Vulgaria is a 2012 Hong Kong comedy film directed by Pang Ho-cheung.

The film won Best Supporting Actor and Best Supporting Actress at the 32nd Hong Kong Film Award.

Plot
Struggling movie producer To Wai-cheung is hardly able to make alimony payments to his ex-wife, and yet his daughter Jacqueline hopes to one day see him being interviewed by TVB so she can show her schoolmates her father is a real movie producer. In order to fulfill his daughter's dream, through his best buddy Lui he meets Tyrannosaurus, a Guangxi based triad head and a movie investor with a peculiar taste. Tyrannosaurus takes the duo out to a dinner full of weird dishes. He wants a remake of his favorite film, the 1976 Shaw Brothers sex scorcher Confession of a Concubine, to be renamed as Confessions of Two Concubines, but only if Siu Yam-yam reprises her original starring role. As Siu Yam-yam is unwilling to act naked at her present age, To has to hire Popping Candy, with whom he has oral sex, as Siu's body double. Worse still, To and Liu, who refuse to eat the dishes before them, are told by Tyrannosaurus that the deal can be sealed only if they have sex with a mule.

Cast
Chapman To as To Wai-cheung, a movie producer
Ronald Cheng as Brother Tyrannosaurus
Dada Chan as Popping Candy
Fiona Sit as Quin, To's assistant
Matt Chow as Blackie Tat, a movie director
Lawrence Cheng as university professor Cheng
Simon Lui as Lui Wing-shing, To's best friend
Lam Suet as Tyranosaurus' henchman
Siu Yam-yam as herself
Hiro Hayama as himself
Nora Miao as Miss Cheung
Vincent Kuk as CEO of Playboy
Kristal Tin as Barrister Tsang Lai-fong, To's ex-wife
Miriam Yeung as investigator Leung
Jim Chim as Firearm Lau
Mak Ling-ling as hypnotist

Release 
The film received HK$30 million at the box office.

Critical reception
Deborah Young of The Hollywood Reporter said, "Fully living up to its title, Vulgaria is Hong Kong comedy at its breeziest and most communicative."

Richard Kuipers of Variety said, "Freewheeling pic, helmed by the prolific Pang Ho-cheung scores more hits than misses and, deep down, has a warm heart that bobs up nicely in the closing stages."

Beijing film critic Jia Xuanning won the Hong Kong Arts Development Council's inaugural Critic's Prize with a critique essay of Vulgaria. Entitled "Gazing at the Anxiety of Hong Kong Film Through Vulgaria", the essay critiqued the film's low brow humor and negative portrayal of mainlanders. Pang responded by arguing that the "Hong Kong spirit is embodied in freedom of speech".

The film was nominated for six Golden Horse Awards.

References

External links

Hong Kong comedy films
2012 comedy films
Films directed by Pang Ho-cheung
2012 films
2010s Cantonese-language films
Films set in Hong Kong
Films shot in Hong Kong
Films set in Guangxi
2010s Hong Kong films